Free Wired is the third studio album and major label debut of American  group Far East Movement, released on October 12, 2010, by Cherrytree Records and Interscope Records.

The album debuted at number twenty-four on the Billboard 200, with sales of 17,000. The album has sold 168,000 copies in the US as of January 2012.

The first single "Like a G6" was released on April 13, 2010. It reached number one on the Billboard Hot 100. The second official single is "Rocketeer", which features Ryan Tedder from OneRepublic. The music video for the song premiered on VEVO and YouTube on October 29, 2010.  "Rocketeer" reached number seven on the Billboard Hot 100.

The song "Girls on the Dance Floor" was originally included on the 2009 album Animal.

Background
Speaking about the album in March 2011 to Blues & Soul—Kev Nish of Far East Movement stated: "'Free Wired' was basically a slang-word we came up with back in the day, that we'd use whenever we'd do something that was outside the box, that was original, that was fresh, and that mashed-up things that maybe SHOULDN'T have been mashed-up! Which is why, when it came to titling this album, it made so much SENSE! Because it really represented our lifestyle, represented what we listen to... You know, we'd basically go in the studio and take hip hop-style drums, electronic synths, alternative-style hooks and just - as I say - mash it all UP!... So yeah, with 'Free Wired' you definitely get exactly what it says in the TITLE!"

Track listing
 All songs were written by Jae Choung, James Roh, Kevin Nishimura and Virman Coquia. Additional writers are noted below.

Samples and interpolations
"So What?"
 Contains elements of "So Whatcha Want" by Beastie Boys
"Don't Look Now"
 Contains additional vocals recorded by Bryan "The Beard" Jones
"Fighting For Air"
 Contains additional recording by Justin "Kanobby" Keitt

Charts

References

Far East Movement albums
2010 albums
Interscope Records albums
Albums produced by the Cataracs
Albums produced by the Smeezingtons
Interscope Geffen A&M Records albums
Cherrytree Records albums
Albums produced by Fernando Garibay